Erfan Nasajpour (born 21 March 1984) is an Iranian-Canadian retired professional basketball player. He played his whole career in the Iranian Basketball Super League.

Early life
Nasajpour was born in Iran and immigrated with his family to Winnipeg, Manitoba in 1991. He attended high school at Daniel McIntyre Collegiate Institute, and was captain for the University of Winnipeg in U Sports.

Career 
  University of Winnipeg (U Sports) - 2004-2008
  Zob Ahan Isfahan (ISL) - 2008-2010
  Petrochimi Bandar Imam (ISL) - 2010-2015
  Samen Mashhad (ISL) - 2015-2016
  Shahrdari Tabriz (ISL) - 2016-2018

Honours 
2002 Canadian U18 National Team
2003 Global Games U18 in Dallas
2005 Canadian University National Team in Izmir Turkey
2004/05 All-CanWest 1st Team
2005/06 All-CanWest 2nd Team
2006/07 2nd Team All-Canadian
2007/08 2nd Team All-Canadian

References

1984 births
Living people
Basketball players from Winnipeg
Canadian men's basketball players
Canadian people of Iranian descent
Iranian men's basketball players
Winnipeg Wesmen basketball players